Bambara Kannaley (lit. With the eyes like spinning top) (spelt onscreen as Bambharakannaley) is a 2005 Indian Tamil-language romantic comedy film directed by Parthi Bhaskar. The film stars Srikanth and Arthi Agarwal in lead roles. It was opened to negative reviews. The film's title is based on a song form Manamagan Thevai (1957).

Plot
Arumugam (Srikanth) comes to Ooty for a job and falls in love with Pooja (Aarthi Agarwal). However, Pooja already has a fiancé  Gautham (Vikramadithya), who isn't as good as he appears to be. What happens to Arumugam's love is the rest of the movie.

Cast

Production
This was Aarthi Agarwal's first and only film in Tamil.

Soundtrack

The music was composed by Srikanth Deva and released by Star Music.

Reception
Indiaglitz praised the performances of actors and music. BBthots wrote "Bambara Kannaley" is a love story without much love. Romance is the basis for everything that happens in the film but the romance itself occupies very little of its running time. That by itself is not a bad thing. But the rest of the running time is occupied by things that range from the uninteresting to the outright bad".

References

External links
 

2005 films
2000s Tamil-language films
Films scored by Srikanth Deva
2005 romantic comedy films